The Gift is the second album and first Christmas album by Scottish singer Susan Boyle, which was released on 8 November 2010. Boyle hinted that the album has a 1960s feel "because that was [her] era". Despite having a mixed critical reception, the album debuted at number one on both the British and American album charts and received a nomination at the 54th Grammy Awards for Best Traditional Pop Vocal Album.

Background
It was produced by Steve Mac, who says, "Now Susan’s used to the studio and the recording process, this time round we might go even further down a traditional route of recording by getting a band together and rehearsing songs before we go into the studio to see what works, how she reacts with certain parts, and so we can change the arrangements that way. I think that’s going to work much better... With Susan it's very important she connects with the public and the public connect with her. She doesn’t want to sing anything that hasn’t happened to her or she can't relate to."

Susan's Search competition
In a lead up to the release, Boyle offered her fans a chance to duet with her, with a competition titled Susan's Search. Applicants had to record a video of themselves singing "Silent Night" and upload it to her YouTube channel. The winner was 33-year-old paramedic Amber Stassi of Brewerton, New York.

Critical reception

The album has received generally lukewarm reviews from critics. Stephen Thomas Erlewine of Allmusic gave the album two and a half out of five stars, complimenting Boyle as the right person to make a holiday album, but referred to the music as "predictable". Graham Rockingham of Metro International gave the album mixed reviews, criticising how the album can be a number 1 charter, but at the same time be well suited for traditional carols.

Commercial performance
In the UK, The Gift debuted at No. 1. However, it remained at the top spot for only one week and dropped out of the chart altogether after eleven weeks. In comparison, Boyle's first album topped the UK chart for four weeks and remained on the chart for 39 weeks.

In the United States, The Gift debuted at the top of the Billboard 200 chart with first week sales of 318,000 copies. In its second week, the album stayed at No. 1, and sold even more copies: 335,000. In its third week, it dropped to No. 3 on the Billboard 200, selling 263,000 copies. In its fourth week, The Gift returned to No. 1, selling 272,000 additional copies. The album remained at No. 1 in its fifth week with sales of 243,000 copies. By the end of 2010, sales of The Gift totalled 1,852,000 copies in the United States, and was the fifth best-selling album for the year. As of November 2014, the album has attained cumulative sales of 2,180,000 copies in the United States according to SoundScan.

The album debuted at No. 3 on the Canadian Albums Chart, selling 13,000 copies in its first week.

Track listing

Release history

Charts

Weekly charts

Year-end charts

Decade-end charts

Certifications

References

Susan Boyle albums
Syco Music albums
Columbia Records Christmas albums
2010 Christmas albums
Christmas albums by Scottish artists
Covers albums